The Cincinnati Herald is an African-American newspaper published each Wednesday by Sesh Communications in Cincinnati, Ohio, United States. The Heralds offices are located in the Avondale neighborhood. Sister publications include The Dayton Defender, The Northern Kentucky Herald, and SeshPrime Magazine, a monthly magazine for African-Americans.

History
The Herald was founded in 1955 by Gerald Porter. When Porter died in 1963, his wife Marjorie Parham assumed control of the paper. In 1996, Parham sold the paper to Sesh Communications, a partnership between Eric Kearney, Jan-Michele Lemon, Wilton Blake, and Ronda Gooden.

See also  
List of African-American newspapers in Ohio

References

External links
 
 

Newspapers published in Cincinnati
Newspapers established in 1955
1955 establishments in Ohio
African-American newspapers